Lot 36 is a township in Queens County, Prince Edward Island, Canada.  It is part of Bedford Parish. Lot 36 was awarded to merchants George Spence and John Mill in the 1767 land lottery. It was sold to Donald MacDonald in 1775.

References

36
Geography of Queens County, Prince Edward Island